The Roman Catholic Diocese of Séez (Latin: Dioecesis Sagiensis; French: Diocèse de Séez) is a diocese of the Roman Catholic Church in France. Originally established in the 3rd century, the diocese encompasses the department of Orne in the region of Normandy. The episcopal see is the cathedral in Sées, and the diocese is a suffragan of the Archdiocese of Rouen.

History
Saint Ebrulf, a native of the Diocese of Bayeux, founded, after 560, several monasteries in the Diocese of Séez; one of them became the important Abbey of Saint-Martin-de-Séez, which, owing to the influence of Richelieu, its administrator-general, was reformed in 1636 by the Benedictines of Saint-Maur. Rotrou II, Count of Perche, in fulfillment of a vow, established in 1122, at Soligny, the Abbey of La Trappe, in favour of which bulls were issued by popes Eugene III (1147), Alexander III (1173) and Innocent III (1203), and which was reformed in 1662 by Abbot Armand Jean le Bouthillier de Rancé.

During the French Revolution the Trappists went with Dom Augustin de Lestranges, 26 April 1791, into Switzerland, where they founded the convent of La Val Saint, but returned to Soligny soon after the accession of Louis XVII. Among the abbots of the Trappist monastery at Soligny were: Cardinal Jean du Bellay, who held a number of bishoprics and resigned his abbatial dignity in 1538; the historian Dom Gervaise, superior of the abbey from 1696–8.

On the occasion of the St Bartholomew's Day massacre in 1572 Matignon, leader of the Catholics, succeeded in saving the lives of the Protestants at Alençon. The cathedral of Séez dates from the twelfth century; that of Alençon was begun in the fourteenth.

The diocese was re-established by the Concordat of 1802, which, by adding to it some parishes of the Dioceses of Bayeux, Lisieux, Le Mans and Chartres, and by cutting off some districts formerly included in it, made it exactly coextensive with the department. It is suffragan to the Archdiocese of Rouen in Normandy.

In 1884 Monseigneur Buguet, curé of Montligeon chapel, founded an expiatory society for the abandoned souls in Purgatory, since erected by Pope Leo XIII into a Prima Primaria archconfraternity, which publishes six bulletins in different languages and has members in every part of the world. Notre Dame de la Chapelle Montligeon is also a place of pilgrimage. The Grande Trappe of Soligny still exists in the Diocese of Séez, which before the application of the law of 1901 against religious congregations had different teaching congregations of brothers, in addition to the Redemptorists. Among the congregations of nuns originating in the diocese may be mentioned: the Sisters of Providence, a teaching and nursing institute founded in 1683 with mother-house at Séez; the Sisters of Christian Education, established in 1817 by Abbé Lafosse, mother-house at Argentan, and a branch of the order at Farnborough in England; the Sisters of Mercy, founded in 1818 by Abbé Bazin to nurse the sick in their own homes.

Some bishops
According to the Georges Goyau, "Louis Duchesne believed that for the period anterior to 900 no reliance can be placed on the episcopal catalogue of Séez, which we know by certain compilations of the sixth century."  A later tradition assigns Saint Latuinus to the first century and make him a missionary sent by Pope Clement I.

Saint Latuinus (Lain, Latuin) (5th century?).
Sigisbald (451?)
Saint Landry of Séez (480?)
Passivus, first bishop of Séez historically known, according to Louis Duchesne.  Assisted at four councils after the year 533.
Saint Raverennus (date uncertain)
Saint Aunobertus (about 689); assassinated, whose double episcopacy Duchesne assigns to the close of the seventh or the beginning of the eighth century
Hildebrand, predecessor of Adelin
Saint Adelin of Séez, author of a work on the life and miracles of Saint Opportuna of Montreuil
Gerard I (d. 1091)
Gervase (1220–1228), a Premonstratensian, who had the confidence of Celestine III, Innocent III, and Honorius III
Jean Bertaut (1607–1611), who, with his fellow-student and friend, Du Perron, contributed to the conversion to Catholicism of Henry IV of France, and who was esteemed for his poetical talents.
Guillaume-André-Réné Baston, appointed by Napoleon.

Saints and pilgrimages

Some saints were especially venerated in this diocese. These included Ravennus and Rasyphus, martyred in the diocese about the beginning of the third century. Saint Céronne (d. about 490) founded two monasteries of nuns near Mortagne; and Saint Cenerius, or Céneri (d. about 669), born at Spoleto, was the founder of the monastery of Saint Cenerius. Saint Opportuna, sister of Saint Chrodegang, and her aunt, Saint Lanthilda, were abbesses of the two monasteries of Almenèches (end of the seventh or beginning of the eighth century). Saint Evremond (d. about 720) was the founder of the monasteries of Fontenay les Louvets and Montmevrey. Saint Osmund, Bishop of Salisbury (d. 1099), as Comte de Séez, followed William the Conqueror into England.

The chief pilgrimages in the diocese were Notre-Dame de Champs at Séez, Notre-Dame du Vallet, Notre-Dame du Repos, near Almenèches, three very ancient shrines; Notre-Dame de Lignerolles, a pilgrimage of the seventh century; Notre-Dame de Recouvrance, at Les Tourailles, dating beyond 900; Notre-Dame de Longny, established in the sixteenth century; Notre-Dame du Lignon, a pilgrimage of the seventeenth century.

Bishops

Ancient era

 Saint Latuin, apostle of Seez, legendary, fifth century
 Saint Sigisbold, c. 460
 Saint Landry, c. 460
 Nile or Hille (Hillus), 5th century
 Hubert de Sees, c. 500
 Litardus, Litharedus or Lotharius, 511 (First Council of Orléans)
 Passiv (City of the Councils of Orléans 533, 538, 541 and 549) 533–549
 Leudobaude (Cited at the Council of Tours of 567 and at the Council of Paris of 573) 567–573
 Marcel (quoted at the Council of Paris 614) 614
 Amlacaire (cited in the Council of Chalon 647/53) 647/653
 Saint Reverend, 670–682, (questionable information) [réf. necessary]
 Saint Annobert or Alnobert, quoted at the Council of Rouen of 692, died in 706
 Rodobert or Chrodobert, 706, also count of Hiémois
 Hugues I (bishop of Sees), 8th century
 Saint Ravenger, ???–750
 Saint Loyer or Lothaire, around 750
 Saint Chrodegang or Godegrand, ???– 770
 Saint Gerard, 765–805
 Reginald of Sees, about 811
 Ingelnom, c. 833
 Saxobold, 840–852
 Saint Adelin, Adalhelm (Adalhelmus), c. 879–916, becomes slave of the Vikings
 Robert I, tenth century
 Benedict, tenth century
 Azon the Venerable, c. 986–1006
 Richard I
 Sigefroi or Sigefroi, c. 1010–1026
 Radbod, c. 1025–v. 1030
 Yves de Bellême, c. 1035–1070
 Robert II of Ryes, c. 1070–v. 1081
 Gerard I, 1082–1091
 Serlon d'Orgères, 1091–1123, previously abbot of Saint-Évroult
 John I of Neuville, 1124–1143
 Gerard II, 1144–1157
 Froger, 1157–1184
 Lisiard, 1184–1201
 Sylvestre, 1202–1220, replaces Raoul du Merle who was elected in 1201 but whose election was rejected by supporters of Jean sans Terre
 Gervais I of Chichester, also abbot-general of Prémontrés4, 1220–1228
 Hugues II, 1228 - 1240
 Geoffroy de Mayet, 1240–1258
 Thomas of Aunou, 1258–1278
 John II of Bernieres, 1278–1292
 Philippe Le Boulenger, 1294–1315
 Richard II of Sentilly, 1315–1320
 William I Mauger, 1320–1356
 Gervais II of Belleau, 1356–1363
 William II of Rance, 1363–1378
 Gregory Langlois, 1378–1404
 Pierre Beaublé, 1404–1408
 John III, 1408–1422
 Robert III of Rouvres, 1422–1433
 Thibaut Lemoine, 1433–1434
 Jean IV Chevalier, 1434–1438
 Jean V of Pérusse d'Escars, 1438–1454
 Robert IV of Cornegrue, 1454–1478
 Étienne Goupillon, 1478–14935
 Gilles de Laval, 1493–1502
 Claude d'Husson, 1503–1510
 Jacques de Silly, 1511–1539
 Nicolas of Dangu, 1539–1545
 Pierre Duval, 1545–1564
 Louis of the Moulinet, 1564–1601
 Claude de Morenne, 1601–1606
 Jean Bertaut, abbot of Aunay, 1606–1611
 Jacques Suares, 1611–1614
 Jacques Camus of Pontcarré, 1614–1650

Modern era

 François de Rouxel de Médavy (1651 Appointed – 1671 Appointed, Archbishop of Rouen)
 Louis Thomas d'Acquin (1667 Appointed – 7 May 1710 Died)
 Jean de Forcoal ( 1671 Appointed – 22 Feb 1682 Died)
 Mathurin Savary (22 May 1682 Appointed – 16 Aug 1698 Died)
 Louis d'Aquin (1 Nov 1698 Appointed – 17 May 1710 Died)
 Dominique-Barnabé Turgot de Saint-Clair (12 Jul 1710 Appointed – 18 Dec 1727 Died)
 Jacques-Charles-Alexandre Lallemant (27 Mar 1728 Appointed – 6 Apr 1740 Died)
 Louis-François Néel de Christot (5 May 1740 Appointed – 8 Sep 1775 Died)
 Jean-Baptiste du Plessis d'Argentré (17 Sep 1775 Appointed – 24 Feb 1805 Died)
 Hilarion-François de Chevigné de Boischollet (9 Apr 1802 Appointed – 12 Feb 1812 Died)
 Alexis Saussol (8 Aug 1817 Appointed – 7 Feb 1836 Died)
 Mellon de Jolly (25 May 1836 Appointed – 19 Nov 1843 Appointed, Archbishop of Sens and Auxerre)
 Charles-Frédéric Rousselet (26 Nov 1843 Appointed – 1 Dec 1881 Died)
 François-Marie Trégaro (1 Dec 1881 Succeeded – 6 Jan 1897 Died)
 Claude Bardel (14 Apr 1897 Appointed – 16 Feb 1926 Died)
 Octave-Louis Pasquet (21 Jun 1926 Appointed – 31 Mar 1961 Retired)
 André-Jean-Baptiste Pioger (31 Mar 1961 Appointed – 24 Jul 1971 Retired)
 Henri-François-Marie-Pierre Derouet (24 Jul 1971 Succeeded – 10 Oct 1985 Appointed, Bishop of Arras (–Boulogne–Saint-Omer))
 Yves-Maria Guy Dubigeon (22 Aug 1986 Appointed – 25 Apr 2002 Retired)
 Jean-Claude Boulanger (25 Apr 2002 Succeeded – 12 Mar 2010 Appointed, Bishop of Bayeux and Lisieux)
 Jacques Léon Jean Marie Habert (28 Oct 2010 Appointed – 10 Nov 2020 Appointed, Bishop of Bayeux and Lisieux)
 Bruno Feillet (17 July 2021 – present)

References

Bibliography

Reference books

  pp. 427–428. (in Latin)
 pp. 226–227.
 p. 288.
 p. 299.
 p. 338.
 p. 362.

Studies
Desportes, Pierre – Fouché, Jean-Pascal – Loddé, Françoise –Vallière, Laurent (ed.) (2005): Fasti Ecclesiae Gallicanae. Répertoire prosopographique des évêques, dignitaires et chanoines des diocèses de France de 1200 à 1500. IX. Diocèse de Sées. Turnhout, Brepols.

External links
 Diocèse de Séez

S
3rd-century establishments in Roman Gaul